Lägh dal Lunghin (German: Lunghinsee) is a lake at an elevation of 2484 m, below the peak of Piz Lunghin, in the Graubünden, Switzerland. It is considered the source of the Inn River.

See also
List of mountain lakes of Switzerland

Lakes of Graubünden
Lunghin
Engadin
Bregaglia